The Loughborough Trophy was a professional tennis tournament played on indoor hard courts. It was part of the ATP Challenger Tour. It was held in Loughborough, United Kingdom in 2018.

Past finals

Singles

Doubles

ATP Challenger Tour
Hard court tennis tournaments
Tennis tournaments in England
Loughborough